Turtle Lake is a city in McLean County, North Dakota, United States. The population was 542 at the 2020 census. Turtle Lake was founded in 1905.

Geography and climate
Turtle Lake is located at  (47.519378, -100.890857).

Demographics

2010 census
As of the census of 2010, there were 581 people, 278 households, and 159 families residing in the city. The racial makeup of the city was 95.5% White, 0.3% African American, 2.1% Native American, 0.2% Asian, and 1.9% from two or more races. Hispanic or Latino of any race were 0.2% of the population.

There were 278 households, of which 19.4% had children under the age of 18 living with them, 48.2% were married couples living together, 6.5% had a female householder with no husband present, 2.5% had a male householder with no wife present, and 42.8% were non-families. 39.6% of all households were made up of individuals, and 24.1% had someone living alone who was 65 years of age or older. The average household size was 2.02 and the average family size was 2.65.

The median age in the city was 52.1 years. 17.6% of residents were under the age of 18; 5% were between the ages of 18 and 24; 18% were from 25 to 44; 28.8% were from 45 to 64; and 30.5% were 65 years of age or older. The gender makeup of the city was 49.2% male and 50.8% female.

2000 census
As of the census of 2000, there were 580 people, 290 households, and 171 families residing in the city. The population density was 1,154.2 people per square mile (447.9/km). There were 329 housing units at an average density of 654.7 per square mile (254.1/km). The racial makeup of the city was 98.79% White, 0.86% Native American, 0.17% Asian, and 0.17% from two or more races.

There were 290 households, out of which 18.6% had children under the age of 18 living with them, 53.4% were married couples living together, 2.8% had a female householder with no husband present, and 40.7% were non-families. 38.3% of all households were made up of individuals, and 25.2% had someone living alone who was 65 years of age or older. The average household size was 1.97 and the average family size was 2.57.

In the city, the population was spread out, with 16.4% under the age of 18, 2.9% from 18 to 24, 22.4% from 25 to 44, 24.8% from 45 to 64, and 33.4% who were 65 years of age or older. The median age was 52 years. For every 100 females, there were 95.9 males. For every 100 females age 18 and over, there were 88.0 males.

The median income for a household in the city was $26,618, and the median income for a family was $36,667. Males had a median income of $32,917 versus $17,417 for females. The per capita income for the city was $16,848. About 2.3% of families and 5.3% of the population were below the poverty line, including 2.4% of those under age 18 and 7.9% of those age 65 or over.

References

Cities in McLean County, North Dakota
Cities in North Dakota
Populated places established in 1904
1904 establishments in North Dakota